Shahid Akbar (6 September 1958 – 28 November 2012) was an Indian cricketer. He played 31 first-class matches for Hyderabad between 1976 and 1984.

See also
 List of Hyderabad cricketers

References

External links
 

1958 births
2012 deaths
Indian cricketers
Hyderabad cricketers
Cricketers from Hyderabad, India